Dennys may refer to:

 Denny's, a large family restaurant chain of pancake houses in the United States and Canada
 Joyce Dennys (1893–1991), English cartoonist, illustrator and painter
 Rodney Dennys (1911–1993), British foreign service operative
 Dennys Reyes (born 1977), Mexican baseball pitcher with the St. Louis Cardinals

See also
 
Denny (disambiguation)
Denys